Park Jae-seung (Korean: 박재승, Hanja: 朴在昇, born 1 April 1923) is a South Korean football defender who played for South Korea in the 1954 FIFA World Cup. He also played for Seoul Football Club.

References

External links
FIFA profile

1923 births
Possibly living people
South Korean footballers
South Korea international footballers
Association football defenders
1954 FIFA World Cup players
1956 AFC Asian Cup players
AFC Asian Cup-winning players